Independent lifeboat services in Britain and Ireland began to be established around the coasts towards the end of the 18th century in response to the loss of life at sea. More recently, independent services have been set up in response to the increasing popularity of coastal and river sport and leisure activities.

There are at least 80 (see tables below) and as many as 100 independent lifeboat services operating throughout Britain and Ireland, both on coasts and inland waterways. This means that around a quarter of the UK and Ireland's lifeboat services are non RNLI.

Because the Royal National Lifeboat Institution (RNLI) owns and operates the majority of lifeboat stations (238 in 2018), smaller independent services can be overshadowed when it comes to publicity and fundraising.

Independent services are usually funded privately and most are registered charities; most operate 24 hours a day, every day of the year. Many currently-independent, RNLI-adopted and lapsed services pre-date the RNLI (founded 1824 as the National Institution for the Preservation of Life from Shipwreck).

History

The first recorded independent lifeboat service was established in 1776 at Formby, 7 miles south of Southport, where there is still an independent lifeboat service (see table). Many early lifeboat stations were taken under the wing of the Royal National Lifeboat Institution after its foundation in 1824 and throughout the 19th and 20th centuries.

Few early stations retained their independence; some were closed by the RNLI many years after takeover, according to the local needs at the time, and of these some were re-established as independent services, sometimes years later. A few 20th century independent services were started up in response to the rapid increase in popularity and affordability of aquatic sport and leisure activities such as swimming, boating, windsurfing, angling and diving.

It has not been established how many independent lifeboat services there are (2014) because there is no umbrella organisation except for some stations in Ireland and the River Severn area (see table below). All, though, are crewed by volunteers and equipped with boats ranging from retired RNLI lifeboats to state-of-the-art boats paid for by fundraising campaigns.

Independent lifeboat services in Britain and Ireland
Independent lifeboat services are spread across England, Wales, Scotland, Northern Ireland and the Republic of Ireland. Some are primarily inland rescue services.

Note: Some services appear twice where they cover border areas.

United Kingdom

England

Northern Ireland

Scotland

Wales

Republic of Ireland
Some independent services come under the umbrella of Community Rescue Boats Ireland (CRBI) and are trained and administrated by Irish Water Safety.

See also
 Lifeboat (rescue)
 Search and rescue (Ireland)
 Search and rescue (UK)
 List of lifeboat disasters in Britain and Ireland

References

Sea rescue organisations of the United Kingdom
Emergency services in the United Kingdom